The Summit Church is a Baptist Evangelical multi-site megachurch headquartered in Durham, North Carolina and meeting at 12 campuses across the Triangle area. It is affiliated with the Southern Baptist Convention. Regular attendance averages nearly 11,564 people weekly.

History
The Summit Church began in 1961 when Sam James preached the first service at what was then the Grace Baptist Mission in Durham. Within a year, the mission had grown into the new Homestead Heights Baptist Church. The Church grew to a membership of over 150 by 1965 and as it continued to grow, the congregation constructed a new church building in the 1980s to host close to 600 people. Although it briefly exceeded capacity, the 1990s saw little growth and eventually declined to a stable 400 members.

In 2002, Homestead Heights called its college pastor of a year and a half, J.D. Greear, to be pastor.  Upon accepting the position, Greear called for the renaming and ultimately the re-launching of the church as the Summit Church. In the first three years, a large influx of members eventually led to the sale of its property located on Holt School Road, and in April 2005 the church began holding services at Riverside High School.

According to a census of the denomination published in 2020, it said it has a weekly attendance of 11,564 people and 12 campuses in different cities.

References

External links
Official website
Pastor J.D.'s blog

Christian organizations established in 1961
Baptist churches in North Carolina
Churches in Raleigh, North Carolina
Churches in Durham, North Carolina
20th-century Baptist churches in the United States
1961 establishments in North Carolina
Southern Baptist Convention churches
Evangelical megachurches in the United States
Megachurches in North Carolina